The 1934–35 British Home Championship was a football tournament played between the British Home Nations during the 1934–35 season. Scotland and England shared the trophy after a dramatic final match in which the Scots beat England to claim a share of the cup after having seemingly come adrift following their early defeat to Ireland.

It was England and Ireland who began strongest, England thumping the trophy-holders Wales 4–0 in Cardiff whilst the Irish defeated the Scots in Belfast 2–1. Scotland recovered in the second game, beating Wales 3–2 at home to reenter the race for the tournament as England beat Ireland in a close game in Liverpool to become favourites. In the final matches, Ireland failed to take the necessary points from Wales to push for a joint top spot, falling 3–1 in Wrexham; Peco Bauwens became the first foreigner to referee a match in the tournament. The Scots and the English played in Glasgow, knowing that a draw for the English would be enough to secure them an undisputed victory. This was not to be as by dint of great effort, the Scottish team overcame their Southern rivals 2–0. As goal difference was not at this stage used to separate teams in the British Home Championship, the honours were shared by England and Scotland, whilst Ireland and Wales shared third place.

Table

Results

References

 British Home Championship 1919-20 to 1938-1939  - dates, results, tables and top scorers at RSSSF

1934–35 in English football
1934–35 in Scottish football
Brit
1935 in British sport
1934-35
1934–35 in Northern Ireland association football